Gladys Hynes (1888 – 1958) was a British painter, sculptor and illustrator.

The daughter of Harry Hynes and Eileen Power, both Irish Catholics, she was born in Indore, India and came to London with her family when she was three. Hynes studied with Frank Brangwyn at the London School of Art in Earl's Court. From 1906 to 1907, her family was living in Penzance, Cornwall and she studied with Stanhope and Elizabeth Forbes at their school in Newlyn. She settled in Hampstead in 1919.

Hynes contributed to the Omega Workshops. She portrayed her friend Ezra Pound in her painting Escalator; she also produced the illustrations for Pound's The Cantos. Hynes exhibited with the Royal Academy of Arts. The London Group, the International Society of Sculptors, Painters and Gravers, the Royal Institute of Painters in Water Colours, the Paris Salon and the Walker Art Gallery in Liverpool. Her work was included in a group exhibition at Hartnoll & Eyre in 1972; a painting from that show is held by the Royal Air Force Museum London.

Harold Knight portrayed her in his 1933 painting On the Balcony; he also painted a portrait which he showed at the Royal Academy in 1920. She was also painted by Cedric Morris.

Hynes was a strong supporter of Irish independence and also campaigned for women's rights.

References 

1888 births
1958 deaths
Irish women painters
Irish women sculptors
Irish illustrators